LG Film Awards is an award ceremony for Nepali movies organised by Cine Circle Nepal.

References 

Nepali film awards
Annual events in Nepal